Jacobus Meyer Reinach (born 7 February 1990) is a South African professional rugby union player who plays for the Top 14 side Montpellier and South Africa. His playing position is scrum-half and he is the son of former Springbok winger Jaco Reinach., He was the member of the victorious Springbok team at the 2019 Rugby World Cup in Japan, Yokohama.

Early career
Born and raised in Bloemfontein, Reinach attended the famous rugby school Grey College. He initially played age-level rugby for the Free State, before heading to Durban in 2009 to link up with the Sharks.

Club career
Reinach's first forays into senior rugby came with the Sharks XV in the Vodacom Cup. During the 2011 and 2012 Vodacom Cup competitions he made 17 appearances and scored 3 tries. His good performances at that level saw him promoted to the Sharks Currie Cup squad. He earned his first 2 Currie Cup caps during the 2011 season and over the following 2 campaigns he rotated with the more experienced Charl McLeod for the starting role in the number 9 jersey. He was a Currie Cup winner in 2013 and a runner up in 2012 with both matched being played against . Following McLeod's departure to Grenoble at the conclusion of the 2014 Super Rugby season, Reinach was left as the undisputed first-choice scrum half for the Sharks.

At Super Rugby level, Reinach debuted during the 2012 Super Rugby season however, he only made one appearance which amounted to 1 minute of game-time.

On 27 February 2017, it was announced that Reinach would link up with English club Northampton Saints in the Aviva Premiership from the 2017–18 season.

On 12 June 2020, Reinach officially joined Montpellier in the Top 14 ahead of the 2020–21 season after leaving Northampton

International career
Although his father had twice been selected for South African Schools, Reinach never represented his country at any age-group level. However, this did not stop him from making the full Springbok side at the age of only 24. Reinach debuted as a second-half replacement for Francois Hougaard in South Africa's 28–10 win over Australia in Cape Town on 27 September 2014 and played a big role in the Boks bonus point try scored by Jean de Villiers in the final minute. He got his second taste of international rugby a week later and was again on the winning side as his team earned their first win over the All Blacks since 2011. On 8 October 2019 Reinach scored a hat-trick in a 66–7 win over Canada at the 2019 Rugby World Cup, the fastest hat-trick in Rugby World Cup History. South Africa went on to win the tournament, defeating England in the final.

Springbok statistics

Test Match record 

Pld = Games Played, W = Games Won, D = Games Drawn, L = Games Lost, Tri = Tries Scored, Con = Conversions, Pen = Penalties, DG = Drop Goals, Pts = Points Scored

International Tries

References

External links
 

1990 births
Living people
South African rugby union players
South Africa international rugby union players
Sharks (Currie Cup) players
Sharks (rugby union) players
Rugby union players from Bloemfontein
Alumni of Grey College, Bloemfontein
Afrikaner people
Rugby union scrum-halves
Barbarian F.C. players
Northampton Saints players